Simeon Thomas (born September 22, 1993) is an American football cornerback who is a free agent. He played college football at Louisiana and was drafted in the sixth round by the Cleveland Browns in the 2018 NFL Draft. He has also played for the Seattle Seahawks and Washington Redskins / Football Team.

High school career
Thomas was ranked No. 20 in the Miami Herald list of the top Miami-Dade County recruits as a senior at Carol City High. He made 35 tackles with two interceptions as a senior and played in the Nike Dade against Broward All-Star game. Thomas made 65 tackles with three interceptions as a junior. 
A three-star recruit according to Scout.com, Thomas was ranked the No. 40 cornerback in his class. He committed to Louisiana over offers from Akron, Buffalo, Florida International, Ole Miss, South Alabama, and Syracuse.

College career
In 2013, Thomas was among five Louisiana recruits involved with a scandal in which their ACT answers were supposedly changed by a test administrator. He missed the first three games the same year for academic reasons. He then sat out the entire 2014 season on academic suspension. Thomas also served a nine-game NCAA suspension in 2015, related to the recruiting violations from two years earlier. He didn’t play the final three games because he wanted to save a season of eligibility.

Thomas played all 13 games in 2016, his only full season in college, and compiled 40 tackles, five pass breakups, two interceptions, a forced fumble and a fumble recovery.

In April 2017, Thomas was one of 13 Louisiana players arrested for stealing items from the dorm room of a former teammate who was in jail on a rape charge. The players stole 2,400 worth in items, including video games and clothing. Charges were later reduced to misdemeanors.

Thomas finished his college career with 90 total tackles, three for a loss, two interceptions and one forced fumble.

Professional career

Cleveland Browns
Thomas was drafted by the Cleveland Browns in the sixth round (188th overall) of the 2018 NFL Draft. On May 6, 2018, Thomas signed a rookie contract worth about $2.561 million. It includes a signing bonus worth almost $147,000. He was waived by the Browns on September 1, 2018.

Seattle Seahawks
On September 2, 2018, Thomas was claimed off waivers by the Seattle Seahawks. He was waived on September 8, 2018 and was re-signed to the practice squad. He was released on December 6, 2018, but re-signed six days later.

On January 7, 2019, Thomas signed a reserve/future contract with the Seahawks. He was waived on August 31, 2019 and was signed to the practice squad the next day.

Washington Redskins / Football Team
On September 10, 2019, Thomas was signed to the Washington Redskins' active roster. On December 10, 2019, Thomas was suspended four games for violating the league's policy on substances of abuse. He was reinstated from the first part of his suspension on December 30, 2019. Thomas was placed on injured reserve on September 5, 2020, and spent the first week of the regular season under suspension, before being waived with an injury settlement on September 14, 2020.

Montreal Alouettes
Thomas signed with the Montreal Alouettes of the CFL on June 30, 2021. He was released on July 26, 2021.

Personal life
Thomas's cousin, wide receiver Kermit Whitfield, was a four-year player at Florida State and has been on the rosters of the Chicago Bears and Cincinnati Bengals. Another cousin, Marvin Bracy, also played at Florida State. Bracy was a two-time All-USA high school track and field team selection and a three-time U.S. national champion in the 60-meter dash.

References

External links
Louisiana Ragin' Cajuns bio

1993 births
Living people
American football cornerbacks
Cleveland Browns players
Louisiana Ragin' Cajuns football players
Players of American football from Miami
Seattle Seahawks players
Washington Redskins players
Miami Carol City Senior High School alumni
Washington Football Team players
Montreal Alouettes players
Players of Canadian football from Miami